HD 75289 b is an extrasolar planet orbiting the star HD 75289 in Vela constellation. It has a minimum mass half that of Jupiter, and it orbits in a very short orbit completing one circular revolution around the star in three and a half days. By studying the starlight scientists have concluded that the planet must have an albedo less than 0.12, rather low for a gas giant. Otherwise its reflected light would have been detected.

This planet was discovered  by the Geneva Extrasolar Planet Search team using Doppler spectroscopy.

References

External links
The Extrasolar Planets Encyclopaedia 75289&p2=b entry

Hot Jupiters
Vela (constellation)
Exoplanets discovered in 1999
Giant planets
Exoplanets detected by radial velocity

es:HD 75289#Sistema planetario